Siyabonga Siphika (born 24 April 1981) is a South African former footballer who played at both professional and international levels as a midfielder.

Career
Siphika played club football for Bush Bucks, Manning Rangers, IFK Norrköping, Maritzburg United and Vasco da Gama; he also earned five caps for the South African national side in 2005.

External links

1981 births
Living people
South African soccer players
South Africa international soccer players
South African expatriate soccer players
2005 CONCACAF Gold Cup players
Maritzburg United F.C. players
IFK Norrköping players
Expatriate footballers in Sweden
Manning Rangers F.C. players
Association football midfielders